Live at the Gorge 05/06 is a seven-disc live box set by the American alternative rock band Pearl Jam, released on June 26, 2007 through Rhino Entertainment/Warner Music Group. The box set documents the band's 2005 and 2006 shows at The Gorge Amphitheatre in George, Washington.

Overview
The box set debuted at number 36 on the U.S. Billboard 200 chart with about 19,000 copies sold in its first week. As of April 2008, Live at the Gorge 05/06 has sold around 30,000 copies in the United States according to Nielsen SoundScan.

The band's show of September 1, 2005 took place at the beginning of its fall 2005 North American tour, while the two July 2006 shows concluded the second North American leg of the band's 2006 tour. Between the three concerts there were sixty-nine individual songs performed. The band's cover of Tom Petty's "I Won't Back Down" that was performed at the concert of September 1, 2005 was not originally released on the official bootleg for that show due to a DAT error. The track is present on this release. A mistake on the retail version of the packaging lists the show of September 1, 2005 as September 5, 2005.

Allmusic staff writer Jason Birchmeier gave the box set three and a half out of five stars. He said "it's a great package of shows that fans will want to hear, especially anyone who missed Pearl Jam on their sold-out summer 2006 tour."

Track listing

September 1, 2005

Disc one
"I Believe in Miracles" (Dee Dee Ramone, Daniel Rey) – 6:08
"Elderly Woman Behind the Counter in a Small Town" (Dave Abbruzzese, Jeff Ament, Stone Gossard, Mike McCready, Eddie Vedder) – 4:56
"Off He Goes" (Vedder) – 5:01
"Low Light" (Ament) – 4:06
"Man of the Hour" (Vedder) – 5:23
"I Am Mine" (Vedder) – 4:03
"Crazy Mary" (Victoria Williams) – 7:16
"Black" (Vedder, Gossard) – 7:07
"Hard to Imagine" (Gossard, Vedder) – 4:44

Disc two
"Given to Fly" (McCready, Vedder) – 3:50
"Last Exit" (Abbruzzese, Ament, Gossard, McCready, Vedder) – 2:28
"Save You" (Ament, Matt Cameron, Gossard, McCready, Vedder) – 3:44
"Do the Evolution" (Gossard, Vedder) – 3:55
"Alone" (Abbruzzese, Ament, Gossard, McCready, Vedder) – 2:43
"Sad" (Vedder) – 3:29
"Even Flow" (Vedder, Gossard) – 6:07
"Not for You" (Abbruzzese, Ament, Gossard, McCready, Vedder) – 6:45
"Corduroy" (Abbruzzese, Ament, Gossard, McCready, Vedder) – 4:40
"Dissident" (Abbruzzese, Ament, Gossard, McCready, Vedder) – 5:23
"MFC" (Vedder) – 2:35
"Undone" (Vedder) – 4:27
"Daughter" (Abbruzzese, Ament, Gossard, McCready, Vedder) – 6:34
"In My Tree" (Gossard, Jack Irons, Vedder) – 4:45
"State of Love and Trust" (Vedder, McCready, Ament) – 3:48
"Alive" (Vedder, Gossard) – 7:08
"Porch" (Vedder) – 7:29

Disc three
"Encore Break" – 1:40
"Love Boat Captain" (Boom Gaspar, Vedder) – 5:03
"Insignificance" (Vedder) – 4:43
"Better Man" (Vedder) – 5:24
"Rearviewmirror" (Abbruzzese, Ament, Gossard, McCready, Vedder) – 9:17
"I Won't Back Down" (Tom Petty) – 3:31
"Last Kiss" (Wayne Cochran) – 3:26
"Crown of Thorns" (Ament, Bruce Fairweather, Greg Gilmore, Gossard, Andrew Wood) – 6:36
"Blood" (Abbruzzese, Ament, Gossard, McCready, Vedder) – 5:26
"Yellow Ledbetter" (Ament, McCready, Vedder) – 5:18
"Baba O'Riley" (Pete Townshend) – 4:47

July 22, 2006

Disc one
"Wash" (Ament, Gossard, Dave Krusen, McCready, Vedder) – 4:28
"Corduroy" (Abbruzzese, Ament, Gossard, McCready, Vedder) – 4:30 
"Hail, Hail" (Gossard, Vedder, Ament, McCready) – 3:28
"World Wide Suicide" (Vedder) – 3:33
"Severed Hand" (Vedder) – 5:03
"Given to Fly" (McCready, Vedder) – 3:43
"Elderly Woman Behind the Counter in a Small Town" (Abbruzzese, Ament, Gossard, McCready, Vedder)– 3:17
"Even Flow" (Vedder, Gossard) – 7:50
"Down" (Gossard, McCready, Vedder) – 3:22
"I Am Mine" (Vedder) – 3:53
"Unemployable" (Cameron, McCready, Vedder) – 3:03
"Daughter" / "It's Ok" (Abbruzzese, Ament, Gossard, McCready, Vedder / Dead Moon) – 8:50
"Gone" (Vedder) – 4:17
"Black" (Vedder, Gossard) – 7:45
"Insignificance" (Vedder) – 4:37
"Life Wasted" (Gossard, Vedder) – 3:46
"Blood" (Abbruzzese, Ament, Gossard, McCready, Vedder) – 3:23

Disc two
"Encore Break" – 1:36
"Footsteps" (Gossard, Vedder) – 5:03
"Once" (Vedder, Gossard) – 3:23
"Alive" (Vedder, Gossard) – 5:56
"State of Love and Trust" (Vedder, McCready, Ament) – 3:26
"Crown of Thorns" (Ament, Fairweather, Gilmore, Gossard, Wood) – 6:06
"Leash" (Abbruzzese, Ament, Gossard, McCready, Vedder) – 2:59
"Porch" (Vedder) – 8:52
"Last Kiss" (Cochran) – 3:13
"Inside Job" (McCready, Vedder) – 6:30
"Go" (Abbruzzese, Ament, Gossard, McCready, Vedder) – 2:52
"Baba O'Riley" (Townshend) – 6:03
"Dirty Frank" (Abbruzzese, Ament, Gossard, McCready, Vedder) – 5:25
"Rockin' in the Free World" (Neil Young) – 9:10
"Yellow Ledbetter" / "Little Wing" / "The Star-Spangled Banner" (Ament, McCready, Vedder / Jimi Hendrix / Francis Scott Key, John Stafford Smith) – 9:13

July 23, 2006

Disc one
"Severed Hand" (Vedder) – 4:50
"Corduroy" (Abbruzzese, Ament, Gossard, McCready, Vedder) – 4:36
"World Wide Suicide" (Vedder) – 3:26
"Gods' Dice" (Ament) – 2:25
"Animal" (Abbruzzese, Ament, Gossard, McCready, Vedder) – 2:34
"Do the Evolution" (Gossard, Vedder) – 5:05
"In Hiding" (Gossard, Vedder) – 4:38
"Green Disease" (Vedder) – 2:45
"Even Flow" (Vedder, Gossard) – 8:46
"Marker in the Sand" (McCready, Vedder) – 4:12
"Wasted Reprise" (Gossard, Vedder) – 1:04
"Better Man" / "Save It for Later" (Vedder / Roger Charlery, Andrew Cox, Everett Morton, David Steele, Dave Wakeling) – 7:35
"Army Reserve" (Ament, Vedder, Damien Echols) – 3:55
"Garden" (Vedder, Gossard, Ament) – 3:39
"Rats" (Abbruzzese, Ament, Gossard, McCready, Vedder) – 3:49
"Whipping" (Abbruzzese, Ament, Gossard, McCready, Vedder) – 2:37
"Jeremy" (Vedder, Ament) – 5:19
"Why Go" (Vedder, Ament) – 3:36

Disc two
"Encore Break" – 2:50
"I Won't Back Down" (Petty) – 3:08
"Life Wasted" (Gossard, Vedder) – 3:46
"Big Wave" (Ament, Vedder) – 3:19
"Satan's Bed" (Vedder, Gossard) – 3:02
"Spin the Black Circle" (Abbruzzese, Ament, Gossard, McCready, Vedder) – 2:59
"Alive" (Vedder, Gossard) – 7:03
"Given to Fly" (McCready, Vedder) – 3:53
"Little Wing" (Hendrix) – 5:12
"Crazy Mary" (Williams) – 8:08
"Comatose" (McCready, Gossard, Vedder) – 2:14
"Fuckin' Up" (Young) – 8:12
"Yellow Ledbetter" / "The Star-Spangled Banner" (Ament, McCready, Vedder / Key, Stafford Smith) – 7:14

Personnel

Pearl Jam
Jeff Ament – bass guitar
Matt Cameron – drums
Stone Gossard – guitars
Mike McCready – guitars
Eddie Vedder – vocals, guitars

Additional musicians and production
Fernando Apodaca – director of cover images
John Burton – recording, mixing assistance/Pro Tools engineering
Brett Eliason – mixing
Boom Gaspar – Hammond B3, Fender Rhodes
Joe Gastwirt at Gastwirt Mastering – mastering
Brad Klausen – design and layout
Ananda Moorman – cover images
Jason Mueller – artistic facilitator

Chart positions

References

External links
Live at the Gorge 05/06 information and lyrics at pearljam.com
Live at the Gorge 05/06 e-card

Pearl Jam live albums
2007 live albums
Rhino Records live albums
Warner Music Group live albums